The VoltAero Cassio is a family of hybrid electric aircraft being developed by startup company VoltAero. The company plans to produce three configurations of the Cassio aircraft: the four-place Cassio 330, the six-place Cassio 480, and the ten-place Cassio 600.

Development 
VoltAero was established in Royan in September 2017 by the CTO and test pilot of the 2014 Airbus E-Fan 1.0, with the support of the French Nouvelle-Aquitaine region. The company is assembling a testbed based on the Cessna 337 Skymaster, which was intended to fly in late February 2019.
The clean-sheet, all-composite Cassio prototype should follow in 2020, deliveries were initially anticipated in late 2021 or early 2022.

For ground-testing the propulsion system, a Skymaster airframe was modified into an iron bird, on static display at the June 2019 Paris Air Show.
The Skymaster testbed should fly without its nose engine in September 2019, and with the hybrid power module replacing the rear engine before the end of the year.
The initial power module uses a Nissan automobile engine, followed by an in-house multifuel engine development.
Building three prototypes and a structural test article will need a new fundraising.
The first production aircraft would be delivered by the end of 2022.

By October 2019, VoltAero had upgraded its testbed with two Safran EngineUS 45 motors, each producing  maximum and  continuously, installed on the wing with tractor propellers.
November flight tests from Royan – Médis Aerodrome will keep both piston engines for 15 hours, before removing the forward piston engine for 10 hours.
The aft hybrid system has a  Nissan car engine developed with Solution F, with an additional  Emrax electric motor on the same shaft, for 100 hours of tests including endurance and demonstration flights.
By March 2020, flight trials had begun for the hybrid-electric with its push-pull triple propeller configuration, before unveiling the Cassio 2 on 24 March.

In May 2020, VoltAero presented the production Cassio family: the  combined Cassio 330 offering four seats, to be delivered from 2022, the later  Cassio 480 seating six and the  Cassio 600 accommodating ten people.
The six-seater is planned for 2023 and the 10 seater for 2024.

Design 
 

To be certified under EASA CS-23 regulations, the production configuration is a three-surface layout with a forward fixed canard, an aft, mid-mounted wing, and a twin boom, high tail, framing a single pusher propeller powered by an internal combustion engine and electric motors.
The Cassio will be powered by two  electric motors driving tractor propellers on the wing and a  piston engine and  motor driving a pusher propeller in the aft fuselage.

The combination of fuel and batteries will give it a  range with nine people aboard.
It should fly up to 200 km as a pure electric aircraft,  as a battery-assisted mild hybrid and over 600 km using more its combustion engine.
Its cruise speed should be  cruise its endurance 3.5 h, which could be extended to 5 h.
The production four-seater targets a  field capability within a  MTOW.

Lower noise should be allowed by the electric taxiing and take off, before hybrid power above .
Fuel consumption could be reduced by up to 20%, with hybrid cruise until the batteries have discharged to a 20% energy level, before recharging them with the thermal engine.
The cost of ownership is targeted for €290/h ($323) and a 10 h per day availability should allow eight daily rotations.

Specifications (Cassio 1)

See also 
 Ampaire Electric EEL
 Eviation Alice
 Wright Electric
 Zunum Aero

References 

Proposed aircraft of France
Hybrid electric aircraft
Aircraft first flown in 2020
High-wing aircraft
Twin-boom aircraft
Three-engined push-pull aircraft